The 1961–62 NCAA men's basketball rankings was made up of two human polls, the AP Poll and the Coaches Poll.

Legend

AP Poll 
All AP polls for the 1961–62 season included only 10 ranked teams.

UPI Poll 
The initial UPI poll for this season included only 10 ranked teams, while UPI polls for the remainder of the season included 20 ranked teams.

References 

1961-62 NCAA Division I men's basketball rankings
College men's basketball rankings in the United States